Kapitänleutnant Odo Loewe, Sr. (19 January 1884 – 2 February 1916) was the commander of the zeppelin LZ 54 (L 19) during World War I.

Biography
He was born on 19 January 1884 in Stettin, Germany. On 22 November 1915, took over command of the newly-built zeppelin LZ 54 (L 19) and was stationed in Dresden, Germany. He moved on 29 January 1916 to the airbase in Tønder. Two days later he departed on his fatal expedition.

He died on 2 February 1916 in the North Sea when his zeppelin crashed. He and his crew survived the crash and a British fishing vessel responded to their distress flares. The ship's captain was worried that he would be overpowered by the German crew and let them drown.

Legacy
His son, Odo Loewe, Jr. (1914–1943) would go on to command a U-boat and be killed in action.

References

1884 births
1916 deaths
Imperial German Navy personnel of World War I
German military personnel killed in World War I
People from Szczecin